The 2018 Portland Thorns FC season is the team's and the league's sixth season of existence. The Thorns play in the National Women's Soccer League (NWSL), the top division of women's soccer in the United States. The Thorns are coming into the season as reigning NWSL Champions.

Season review

Off-season 
On September 21, 2017, Raso signed a loan with Brisbane Roar for the 2017–18 W-League season.

on September 24, 2017, the club announced that midfielder Amandine Henry and forward Nadia Nadim will not be returning to the Portland Thorns in 2018 season. The moves were made for financial reasons, NWSL has a strict salary cap of $315,000 for each team and the Thorns could not compete with the offers made by Lyon and Manchester City.

In October 2017, Boureille was loaned to Brisbane Roar for the 2017–18 W-League season.

On October 24, 2017, it was announced that Sonnett signed a loan with Sydney FC for the 2017–18 W-League season.

On January 11, 2018, the club acquired the rights to Australian forward Caitlin Foord and a 2020 conditional natural second-round draft pick from the Seattle Reign in exchange for Allie Long.

On January 12, 2018 Portland acquired Brazilian midfielder Andressinha from the Houston Dash in exchange for forward Savannah Jordan.

On January 17, 2018, Portland Thorns FC selected midfielders Sandra Yu and Gabby Seiler and goalkeeper Bella Geist from the 2018 NWSL College Draft.

On February 15, 2018, Ashleigh Sykes announced her retirement from professional soccer.

Competitions

Preseason
Thorns Spring Invitational presented by Tillamook Yogurt

Regular season

Postseason

Regular-season standings

Results by round

Club

Executive staff

Coaching staff

Squad information

First team squad 
Last updated: March 27, 2018

 (FP) = Federation player
 (Loan) = on loan

Honors and awards

NWSL Season Awards

 Most Valuable Player: Lindsey Horan 
 Defender of the Year: Emily Sonnett (finalist) 
 Coach of the Year: Mark Parsons (finalist)  
 Goalkeeper of the Year: Adrianna Franch (finalist)  
 Best XI: Adrianna Franch, Emily Sonnett, Lindsey Horan, Tobin Heath  
 Second XI: Emily Menges, Christine Sinclair

NWSL Team of the Month

NWSL Player of the Month

NWSL Weekly Awards

NWSL Player of the Week

NWSL Goal of the Week

NWSL Save of the Week

See also 
 2018 National Women's Soccer League season

Notes

References

External links 
 

Portland Thorns FC
Portland Thorns FC seasons
Portland Thorns FC
Portland Thorns FC
Portland